Sir Patrick Hamilton Moberly  (born 2 September 1928) is a retired British diplomat.

He was educated at Winchester College and New College, Oxford before joining the Diplomatic Service in 1951. He worked at the British embassy in Israel as Counsellor (Commercial) from 1970 to 1974. He then served as Head of Personnel Policy Department at the Foreign and Commonwealth Office between 1974 and 1976. He was Assistant Under-Secretary of State for Defence and International Security at the FCO between 1976 and 1981, and was made Companion of the Order of St Michael and St George in 1977.

From 1981 to 1984 Moberly served as British Ambassador to Israel, before serving as British Ambassador to South Africa between 1984 and 1987, during which time he was closely involved in British efforts to bring about an end to Apartheid.  He was knighted as Knight Commander of the Order of St Michael and St George in the 1986 New Year Honours.

References

1928 births
Living people
Ambassadors of the United Kingdom to Israel
Ambassadors and High Commissioners of the United Kingdom to South Africa
Knights Commander of the Order of St Michael and St George
Members of HM Diplomatic Service
People educated at Winchester College
20th-century British diplomats